Faculty of Social Sciences, Chiang Mai University was established together with the university, Faculty of humanities, and Faculty of Science on 18 June 1964. The faculty has arranged undergraduate and graduate (Masters and PhDs) programs in both Thai and international programs.

History
Faculty of Social Sciences, Chiang Mai University is located at the foothill of Doi Suthep, between Suthep and Huay Kaew Road, which is far from Chiang Mai city around 4 kilometers. The cabinet, in 1960, has agreed to the foundation of Chiang Mai University. According to the suggestion of the advisory committee, Faculty of Social Sciences, with only 75 students and 15 lecturers, is one of three faculties which have been established at that time. This faculty was educationally set up as a broad discipline instead of Faculty of Law which could scarcely find qualified personnel in that decade. In the early phase, there were five departments in the faculty including Department of Geography (the first Geography Department in Thailand), Department of Sociology and Anthropology, Department of Economics, Departments of Accountancy and Business Administration, and Department of Political Science. Several departments, however, have been departed from Faculty of Social Sciences as new faculties in last two decades. Faculty of Social Sciences, Chiang Mai University, nowadays, composes of four departments including Geography, Sociology and Anthropology, Women’s Studies, and Social Sciences and Development.

Curriculum and Programs
The faculty, currently, offers various bachelor, master, and doctoral degrees in both Thai and international programs as detailed in the below table.

Center of Research and Academic Services
Center of Research and Academic Services is responsible for collaborating, driving, and integrating various centers and projects under faculty administration to support research, academic services, international exchange program, and personnel’s work. The faculty sets five research clusters based on research expertise, including 1) environment-disaster, forecasting technology and spatial/human impacts; 2) development/social changes, city, food security, health, labour and migration; 3) cultural studies, religion, ethnicity and Lanna studies; 4) women's and gender studies; and 5) regional studies (China, India, ASEAN, border studies, and transnationalism).

University-level Office
 Chiang Mai University Research Ethics Committee (CMUREC)
 Indian Studies Center, Chiang Mai University (ISCCMU)

Faculty-level Center 
 Regional Center for Social Science and Sustainable Development (RCSD)
 Geoinformatics and Space Technology Centre Northern Region (GISTNORTH)
 Chiang Mai University - Sustainable Land Use and Natural Resource Management Academic Center (CMU-SLUSE)
 Biodiversity and Indigenous Knowledge Research Center for Sustainable Development (BIRD)
 Regional Center for Climate and Environmental Studies: RCCES
 Center for Ethnic Studies and Development (CESD)
 Women's Studies Center (WSC)
 China-Southeast Asia Studies Center (CSC)

References

Sources
 Faculty of Social Sciences, CMU
 Department of Geography
 Department of Sociology and Anthropology
 Department of Women's Studies
 Department of Social Sciences and Development
 Center for Research and Academic Services
 Regional Center for Social Science and Sustainable Development, Chiang Mai University (RCSD)
 Doctor of Philosophy Program in Social Science

Chiang Mai University
University departments in Thailand
1964 establishments in Thailand
Educational institutions established in 1964